Leopold the Strong (died 1129) was Margrave of Styria from 1122 to 1129. He was the son of Margrave Ottokar II of Styria and Elisabeth of Austria from the Babenberg family. His wife was Sophie of Bavaria, daughter of Henry IX, Duke of Bavaria. He was succeeded by his son Margrave Ottokar III of Styria. After the death of Henry of Eppenstein in 1122, Leopold inherited the provincia Graslupp, which comprises the estates of Neumarkt and Sankt Lambrecht as well as the Murau region.

References 

1129 deaths
12th-century people of the Holy Roman Empire
Margraves of Styria
Burials at Rein Abbey, Austria
Year of birth unknown